Mingo Township is one of twenty-four townships in Bates County, Missouri, and is part of the Kansas City metropolitan area within the USA.  As of the 2000 census, its population was 235.

The township takes its name from Mingo Creek.

Geography
According to the United States Census Bureau, Mingo Township covers an area of 25.86 square miles (66.99 square kilometres); of this, 25.82 square miles (66.87 square kilometres, 99.82 percent) is land and 0.04 square miles (0.12 square kilometres, 0.18 percent) is water.

Unincorporated towns
 Mayesburg at 
(This list is based on USGS data and may include former settlements.)

Adjacent townships
 Sherman Township, Cass County (north)
 White Oak Township, Henry County (east)
 Walker Township, Henry County (southeast)
 Spruce Township (south)
 Shawnee Township (southwest)
 Grand River Township (west)
 Dayton Township, Cass County (northwest)

Cemeteries
The township contains these four cemeteries: Cove Creek, Earheart, Gragg and Peter Creek.

Rivers
 South Grand River

Lakes
 Clear Lake
 Sprig Lake

School districts
 Adrian County R-III
 Ballard R-II

Political districts
 Missouri's 4th congressional district
 State House District 120
 State Senate District 31

References
 United States Census Bureau 2008 TIGER/Line Shapefiles
 United States Board on Geographic Names (GNIS)
 United States National Atlas

External links
 US-Counties.com
 City-Data.com

Townships in Bates County, Missouri
Townships in Missouri